Elizabeth Wilde (October 18, 1913 – October 29, 2005) was an American sprinter. She competed in the women's 100 metres at the 1932 Summer Olympics.

References

External links
 

1913 births
2005 deaths
Athletes (track and field) at the 1932 Summer Olympics
American female sprinters
Olympic track and field athletes of the United States
Track and field athletes from Kansas City, Missouri
20th-century American women
Olympic female sprinters
21st-century American women